Henry Stanton (c. 1796–1856) was a United States Army officer who was brevetted brigadier-general for meritorious conduct in the Mexican War (1846–1848).

Biography
Stanton born in Vermont about 1796. He was appointed a lieutenant in the light artillery on June 29, 1813, assistant deputy quartermaster-general in July 1813, military secretary to General George Izard in 1814, deputy quartermaster-general, with the rank of major on May 13, 1820, acting adjutant-general under General Thomas S. Jesup in Florida from  1836 to 1837, assistant quartermaster-general, with the rank of colonel on 7 July 7, 1838, and was brevetted brigadier-general for meritorious conduct in the Mexican War on January 1, 1847. He died at Fort Hamilton, New York on 1 August 1856.

Notes

References
 )

1790s births
1856 deaths
People from Vermont
United States Army generals